Gilbert fitz Gilbert de Clare (6 January 1148), was created Earl of Pembroke in 1138.

Life
Born at Tonbridge, Gilbert de Clare was a son of Gilbert Fitz Richard de Clare and Alice de Claremont. He started out without land and wealth of his own but was closely related to very powerful men, specifically his uncles Walter de Clare and Roger de Clare.
 
In 1136, Gilbert fitz Gilbert led an expedition against Exmes and burned parts of the town, including the church of Notre Dame, but was interrupted by the forces of William III, Count of Ponthieu, and escaped the resulting melee only after suffering heavy losses. Gilbert was a Baron, that is, a tenant-in-chief in England, and inherited the estates of his paternal uncles, Roger and Walter, which included the baronies and castles of Bienfaite and Orbec in Normandy. He held the lordship of Nether Gwent and the castle of Striguil (later Chepstow). King Stephen created him Earl of Pembroke, and gave him the rape and castle of Pevensey.

After Stephen's defeat at Lincoln on 2 February 1141, Gilbert was among those who rallied to Empress Matilda when she recovered London in June, but he was at Canterbury when Stephen was recrowned late in 1141. He then joined Geoffrey's plot against Stephen, but when that conspiracy collapsed, he again adhered to Stephen, being with him at the siege of Oxford late in 1142. In 1147, he rebelled when Stephen refused to give him the castles surrendered by his nephew Gilbert, 1st Earl of Hertford, whereupon the King marched to his nearest castle and nearly captured him. However, the Earl appears to have made his peace with Stephen before his death the following year.

Family
He married Isabel de Beaumont, before 1130, daughter of Sir Robert de Beaumont, 1st Earl of Leicester, Count of Meulan, and Elizabeth de Vermandois. Isabel had previously been the mistress of King Henry I of England.

By her, Gilbert had: 
 Richard de Clare, 2nd Earl of Pembroke
 Basilia de Clare, who married (1) Raymond FitzGerald (Raymond le Gros) and (2) Geoffrey FitzRobert.
 a daughter who married William Bloet.

Explanatory notes

References

1100s births
1148 deaths
Year of birth uncertain
Earls Marshal
Anglo-Normans in Wales
Norman warriors
Gilbert de Clare
Lord Marshals of England
Gilbert
People from Pembrokeshire
Peers created by King Stephen